In 1978, four American baseball players were promoted from amateur baseball to the major leagues, including Arizona State University third baseman Bob Horner, who was selected number one overall by the Atlanta Braves. Oakland High School pitchers Tim Conroy and Mike Morgan, and Brian Milner of Toronto also went directly to the big leagues.

In addition to Horner, the Braves also selected future major leaguers Matt Sinatro (2nd round), Steve Bedrosian (3rd round), Rick Behenna (4th round), Jose Alvarez (8th round) and Gerald Perry (11th round).

Others drafted in June 1978 included Lloyd Moseby and Dave Stieb (Toronto), Mike Marshall and Steve Sax (Los Angeles), Cal Ripken Jr. and Mike Boddicker (Baltimore), Kirk Gibson (Detroit), Kent Hrbek (Minnesota) and Hubie Brooks (New York Mets).

First round selections
The following are the first round picks in the 1978 Major League Baseball draft.

Compensation picks

Other notable players 
Danny Heep, 2nd round, 37th overall Houston Astros
Mel Hall, 2nd round, 39th overall Chicago Cubs
Cal Ripken Jr., 2nd round, 48th overall Baltimore Orioles
Steve Balboni, 2nd round, 52nd overall New York Yankees
Steve Bedrosian, 3rd round, 53rd overall Atlanta Braves
Britt Burns, 3rd round, 70th overall Chicago White Sox
Bob Bonner, 3rd round, 74th overall Baltimore Orioles
Rob Deer, 4th round, 85th overall San Francisco Giants
Mike Witt, 4th round, 92nd overall California Angels
Dave Stieb, 5th round, 106th overall Toronto Blue Jays
Mike Marshall (outfielder), 6th round, 151st overall Los Angeles Dodgers
Mike Boddicker, 6th round, 152nd overall Baltimore Orioles
Tim Wallach, 8th round, 196th overall California Angels (did not sign)
Steve Sax, 9th round, 229th overall Los Angeles Dodgers
Mark Langston, 15th round, 377th overall Chicago Cubs (did not sign)
Gary Redus, 15th round, 381st overall Cincinnati Reds
Frank Viola, 16th round, 415th overall Kansas City Royals (did not sign)
Kent Hrbek, 17th round, 432nd overall Minnesota Twins
Eric Show, 18th round, 447th overall San Diego Padres
John Stuper, 18th round, 460th overall Pittsburgh Pirates
Kevin McReynolds, 19th round, 475th overall Milwaukee Brewers (did not sign)
Ryne Sandberg, 20th round, 511th overall Philadelphia Phillies (later played for the Chicago Cubs)
Dave Dravecky, 21st round, 531st overall Pittsburgh Pirates
Howard Johnson, 21st round, 577th overall New York Yankees (did not sign)
Rick Leach, 24th round, 594th overall Philadelphia Phillies (played QB for the Michigan Wolverines)
Vance Law, 39th round, 758th overall Pittsburgh Pirates
Ron Reeves, 47th round, 778th overall Cleveland Indians

References

External links 
 Complete draft list from The Baseball Cube database

Major League Baseball draft
Draft
Major League Baseball draft